The Darwin Aviation Museum, previously known as the Australian Aviation Heritage Centre, displays aircraft and aircraft engines of relevance to the Northern Territory and aviation in Australia generally. It is located in Darwin suburb of Winnellie.

History 
The museum's origins can be traced to 1976 when a group of enthusiasts sought to preserve aviation relics after the destruction of Cyclone Tracy. It was later broadened to include the documentation of World War II aircraft crash sites and the preservation of aviation relics related to the defence of Darwin during World War II. The museum was first opened to the public in 1988. In the late 1980s, the Society negotiated with the United States Air Force (USAF) and the Northern Territory Government to obtain a surplus USAF Boeing B-52 Stratofortress bomber and to build a museum to house and display the aircraft. 

In June 1990, the new Darwin Aviation Museum opened. In 2011, the museum was considered as a display location for one of two Mi-24s confiscated by the Department of Defence in 1997. Due to the presence of asbestos in the airframes, the proposal was dropped. In 2018, the museum acquired a P-3C and looked into expanding their hangar space to house it.

Collection 

The museum has on display a Boeing B-52G bomber. It is on permanent loan from the United States Air Force and is one of only three on public display in the world outside the US. There is a bomb fragment dating from a WWII air raid on Darwin.

Aircraft on display

 Auster J/5P Autocar 3178
 Boeing B-52G Stratofortress 59-2596 "Darwin's Pride"
 CAC Sabre A94-914/A94-921
 Bell AH-1G Cobra 71-21018
 Dassault Mirage IIIO A3-36
 de Havilland DH.82 Tiger Moth A17-4
 de Havilland Dove 1B 4373
 General Dynamics F-111C A8-113
 Hovey Delta Bird
 Mitsubishi MU-2B 37
 Mitsubishi A6M2 Model 21 Zero BII-124
 North American B-25D Mitchell 41-30222
 Rockwell Shrike Commander 500
 Rutan Long-EZ
 Supermarine Spitfire VIII – Replica
 Westland Wessex HAS.31B N7-202

Aircraft engines on display

 Allison J33
 Allison V-1710
 Bristol Centaurus
 Continental O-200
 de Havilland Gipsy Major II
 de Havilland Gipsy Six II
 de Havilland Gipsy Queen 30
 de Havilland Gipsy Queen 70-2
 Franklin 6V4
 Liberty L-12
 Nakajima Sakae 12
 Napier Gazelle
 Pratt & Whitney R-1340 Wasp
 Pratt & Whitney R-1830 Twin Wasp
 Rolls-Royce Avon RA.6
 Rolls-Royce Derwent 8
 Rolls-Royce Merlin XXIII
 Wright R-2600-13 Twin Cyclone

See also 

List of aviation museums

References

External links 
Darwin Aviation Museum – Home Page

1990 establishments in Australia
Museums established in 1990
Museums in Darwin, Northern Territory
Aerospace museums in Australia
Transport museums in the Northern Territory